Hartmut Ebbing (born 13 May 1956) is a German politician of the Free Democratic Party (FDP) who has been serving as a member of the Bundestag from the state of Berlin from 2017 to 2021.

Early life and career
After graduating from the Beethoven Gymnasium in Lankwitz in 1975, Ebbing completed a bank apprenticeship and then studied business administration at the Technical University of Berlin and the University of Illinois, USA. He completed this in 1984 with a degree in business administration. 

Parallel to his studies, Ebbing worked for Berliner Bank. From 1984 to 1991, he worked for the auditing company KPMG in Frankfurt am Main, Hamburg and Berlin and also passed the tax advisor and auditor exams during this time. Since 1992 Ebbing has been a self-employed business consultant and tax auditor.

Political career
Ebbing joined the FDP in 1995. He became member of the Bundestag in the 2017 elections. During his time in parliament, he served as his parliamentary group's spokesperson on cultural affairs.

In November 2020, Ebbing announced that he would not stand in the 2021 federal elections but instead resign from active politics by the end of the parliamentary term.

Other activities
 Foundation for the Humboldt Forum in the Berlin Palace, Member of the Council (since 2018)
 German Historical Museum (DHM), Member of the Board of Trustees (since 2018)
 Haus der Geschichte, Member of the Board of Trustees (since 2018)
 Memorial to the Murdered Jews of Europe Foundation, Member of the Board of Trustees (since 2018)

References

External links 

  
 Bundestag biography 

1956 births
Living people
Members of the Bundestag for Berlin
Members of the Bundestag 2017–2021
People from Steglitz-Zehlendorf
Members of the Bundestag for the Free Democratic Party (Germany)